Parker Carson Airport  is a privately owned, public use airport located five nautical miles (6 mi, 9 km) east of the central business district of Carson City, Nevada, United States. It was formerly known as Parker Carson STOLport.

Facilities and aircraft 
Parker Carson Airport covers an area of 14 acres (6 ha) at an elevation of 4,939 feet (1,505 m) above mean sea level. It has one runway designated 6/24 with a gravel surface measuring 815 by 40 feet (248 x 12 m). This runway was formerly 1,700 feet (518 m) in length.

For the 12-month period ending June 12, 2000, the airport had 1,500 general aviation aircraft operations, an average of 125 per month. At that time there were 5 aircraft based at this airport: 60% ultralight and 40% single-engine.

References

External links 
 Aerial image as of September 1999 from USGS The National Map
 

Airports in Nevada
Buildings and structures in Carson City, Nevada
Transportation in Carson City, Nevada